Abbai Class Ammai Mass is a 2013 Indian Telugu romantic comedy film written and directed by Koneti Srinu, making his debut. The film was produced by Lakshman Kyadri. It features Varun Sandesh and Hariprriya in the lead roles. The supporting cast includes Ali and Srinivasa Reddy. The score and soundtrack for the film is by Shekar Chandra.

Cast 

 Varun Sandesh as Sri
 Hariprriya as Neeru
 Ali
 Srinivasa Reddy as Hrishikesh Mukherjee
 Ahuthi Prasad as KK
 Yanamadala Kasi Viswanath as Das
 Vennela Kishore
 Dhanraj
 Banerjee as MLA
 Sri Lakshmi as Das's grandma

Soundtrack 

The film's background score and the soundtracks are composed by Shekar Chandra. The music rights were acquired by Aditya Music.

References

External links 

 

2013 films
2013 romantic comedy films
Telugu films remade in other languages
2010s Telugu-language films
Indian romantic comedy films
Films shot in Hyderabad, India